San Felipe, Belize, may refer to several places:

 San Felipe, Orange Walk
 San Felipe, Toledo